Chromatic Dark is a Finnish heavy metal band that was founded in 2003 in Oulu. Their music is a mixture of aggressiveness and melody.

Line-up 
 Jussi Niemelä – vocals
 Janne Lunnas – guitar, backing vocals
 Mikko Häkälä – guitar
 Jukka Marjoniemi – bass, backing vocals
 Otto Simola – drums

Discography 
Obsidious (2006)
Hateballads 2008 (2008)
Fractures (2009)
Inhuman Conviction (2011)

External links 
Official site

Finnish musical groups